The Cameron Nunataks are a small cluster of nunataks rising above the west margin of Evans Neve, at the southern end of the Freyberg Mountains. The cluster was mapped by the United States Geological Survey from surveys and from U.S. Navy air photos, 1960–64, and named by the Advisory Committee on Antarctic Names for Roy E. Cameron, biologist at McMurdo Station, summers 1966–67 and 1967–68.

References
 

Nunataks of Antarctica
Landforms of Adélie Land